ME2 or ME-2 may refer to:

 ME2 (gene)
 "Me²", an episode of the British sitcom Red Dwarf
 Mass Effect 2, a video game released for Microsoft Windows and Xbox 360 in 2010, and for PlayStation 3 in 2011
 Maine's 2nd congressional district
 U.S. Route 2 in Maine
 Me1 vs Me2 Snooker with Richard Herring
 Me Two, French film

See also
 Me Too (disambiguation)
 MeetU, web collaboration software by PolyCom
 Mewtwo, a Pokémon